Abahani Limited Dhaka, also referred as Dhaka Abahani or Abahani Limited, is a Bangladeshi professional football club based in the Dhanmondi area of Dhaka, Bangladesh. The club currently competes in the Bangladesh Premier League, the top flight of Bangladeshi Football.

The club was founded as Abahani Krira Chakra, through the re-organisation of Iqbal Sporting Club in 1972 by Sheikh Kamal, the eldest son of Sheikh Mujibur Rahman. In 1989, it was converted into a Limited company. Abahani Limited Dhaka is regarded as one of the country's most renowned and well supported clubs. Since arriving in the domestic football scene, the club has formed a long enduring rivalry with the neighboring Dhaka Mohammedan SC, known as the Dhaka Derby.

The club has won eleven Dhaka League titles, which was the highest tier in Bangladesh until 2006. Since the inception of the country's first professional league, they have achieved a record seven Bangladesh Premier League titles. With 17 domestic league titles, they are the second most successful club in Bangladesh top-tier league history, with the first being rivals Dhaka Mohammedan SC. The club has won both Federation Cup (12 times) and the Independence Cup (2 times) trophies. They have also enjoyed success in both continental and subcontinental football, winning 3 trophies (Charms Cup, Bordoloi Trophy and Sait Nagjee Trophy) from India, while in 2019, Abhani became the first Bangladeshi club to reach the knockout stages of the AFC Cup.

History

Iqbal Sporting Club (1964–1971)
In 1964, after going through many legal implications, former Youth and Sports Secretary of Bangladesh Awami League, Harunur Rashid got hold of the Dhanmondi field in Road No. 19, which was owned by CNB (now known as PWD) back in East Pakistan. However, as an institution was needed to complete the transaction, in May 1966, Rashid established Abahani Samaj Kalyan Samiti, a social welfare association involved with sports, literature and culture. In 1968, Sheikh Mujibur Rahman's eldest son, Sheikh Kamal got involved with Abahani following his fathers request. After the 1971 Bangladesh Liberation War subsided, Kamal decided to create a new club in the newly liberated nation, then he came to know of Iqbal Sporting Club, located in Mohammadpur, the Biharis who played at the club, had fled during the war. The club had already won the second-tier league before the war set about, however, they stopped all club activities the proceeding year due to the state of disarray the country was in. Kamal and co, reformed the club after being granted legal permission, and decided to use the club for Abahani's sports cycle. The reformed club, appointed Nazmul Haque as their first president, while Harunur Rashid and  Mohammad Farooq served as the main secretary and football secretary respectively.

Early years (1972–1979)

Having been crowned the Second division title in 1970 as Iqbal Sporting Club, they were granted a place in the 1972 Dhaka League, renamed as Abahani Krira Chakra Limited. Before the 1972 season went underway, Abahani had already made a name for themselves by attaining the service of the country's first "megastar" footballer, Kazi Salahuddin from Mohammedan SC. Abahani's first league squad consisted of: Abul Kashem, Muslim, Zubair, Abdus Sadek (captain), Sheikh Jamaluddin, Hashemuddin, Farooq, Jahangir Shah Badsha, Mozammel Quader, Kazi Anwar, Mohsin, QM Rafique Dipu, Ranjit Kumar Saha, Gafur Bhuiyan, Sheikh Farid, Kazi Abu Siddique, Gholam Sarwar Tipu, Kazi Salahuddin, Mohammad Hossain, Abdul Quader, Masood Hasan, Sheikh Ashraf Ali, Belal Hossain, Ali Imam (vice-captain) and coach Kabir. Abahani played their first ever top-tier league game against 1970 Dhaka League champions, Bangladesh JIC (BJIC), and ended up earning a 0–0 draw. However, the league was abandoned midway, with the winners being unannounced. Abahani finished their first full season in the 1973 Dhaka League as runner-up, behind Bangladesh JIC. The team displayed their best performance in a 2–0 victory over giant Mohammedan SC, with goals coming from Amalesh Sen and Kazi Salahuddin, the latter scored 24 league goals that year.

Abahani won their first league title in 1974, under the guidance of Irish coach William Bill Hart, Abahani revolutionized the Dhaka football scene with their European style of football. However, the club went through a dark period the subsequent year, following the Assassination of Sheikh Mujibur Rahman, which also claimed the life of founding member Sheikh Kamal. Due to the political situation in the country Abahani's future was left uncertain and were on the path of disbanding only to be saved by some officials and players. Amidst the chaos Abahani lost the league title to Mohammedan SC, starting off the fierce rivalry between the two clubs, which was later branded as the Dhaka Derby. Kazi Salahuddin had already moved to the Hong Kong League before the start of the season, after Sheikh Kamal's murder. The late 90s was a rebuilding era for Abahani, players like Monwar Hossain Nannu, Golam Rabbani Helal, Ashrafuddin Ahmed Chunnu and Amalesh Sen were a major part of the clubs return to glory. Although the club did not enjoy much success at the Aga Khan Gold Cup, they were able break Mohammedan's league dominance, by regaining the Dhaka League title in 1977, after defeating Rahmatganj MFS 3–1 in the league deciding game, with goals coming from Kazi Salahuddin, Khurshid Alam Babul and Kazi Anwar. The return of Kazi Salahuddin, in 1976, was a major boost as he scored 14 goals during their unbeaten 1977 league triumph and again in 1978, helping Abahani retain the title.

Revolutionary Era (1980–1991)

The 1980s saw Abahani and Mohammedan dominate the Dhaka League and their rivalry reach its peak. In the 70s the club did not have an established fanbase but over the following years the "Sky Blue Brigade" was established, rivalling the millions of Mohammedan supporters in the country. Although Mohammedan SC were crowned the first league winners of the new decade, Abahani responded with the signings of Sri Lankan defender Pakir Ali and Rahmatganj MFS midfield maestro Ashish Bhadra. The Ashish–Babul combination in the midfield served both the club and the country with great distinction, as Abahani won the league in 1981, and were joint champions of the Federation Cup alongside Mohammedan. On September 1982, Abahani star players, Kazi Salahuddin, Ashrafuddin Ahmed Chunnu, Golam Rabbani Helal and Kazi Anwar were summarily tried by the military court and sentenced to various terms of imprisonment for the disturbance caused by violently protesting a referee's decision in the Abahani-Mohammedan duel. It was written in the indictment against them that they had initiated a conspiracy to overthrow the military government at the time. The four footballers were later released on the orders of Chief Martial Law Administrator General Hussain Muhammad Ershad, after agitated fans of  both Mohammedan and Abahani protested throughout the country, the event was named as the "Black September" of Bangladeshi football.

In 1983, Abahani added Samrat Hossain Emily from Wari Club to assist the aging Kazi Salahuddin, Emily helped Abahani regain the league title the same year and the following season, Salahuddin's brace in the last league match against Brothers Union meant Abahani were crowned champions for two consecutive year, even after having a six-point deduction. However, while in search of hattrick league champions, club legend Kazi Salahuddin announced his surprise retirement after the 1984 league season. The 1985 was a noteworthy year in Dhaka football as the Dhaka football authority introduced the of the 3 point system in the league, and at the time only the English Leagues were using this system. There was confusion inside the Abahani camp as well, Salahuddin, who had retired the previous year, was made the head coach replacing Ali Imam, who had just won successive league titles. Ali Imam took charge of Brothers Union, determined to take revenge. Nonetheless, new system allowed Abahani to beat Brothers Union to the title, as even after finishing behind Brothers during the normal league stage, Abahani were unbeaten in the Super League, thus completing their domestic league hattrick. A year before Salahuddin had retired, Abahani brought in striker Sheikh Mohammad Aslam from Mohammedan SC, Aslam went onto terrorize the Dhaka field, being named Dhaka league's top goal scorer for 4 consecutive years (1984 to 1987), scoring 17 goals during Abahani's hattrick winning season and also helped the club win their second Federation Cup, in 1985. After their 1985 league triumph Abahani participated in the 1985–86 Asian Club Championship, becoming the first Bangladeshi club to achieve the feat. They defeated Sri Lankan team Saunders SC and Club Valencia from Maldives, 4–1 & 8–1 respectively, however they finished Central Asian Zone runners-up as they lost to India's East Bengal Club 1–0.

In 1986, Sheikh Mohammad Aslam 20 league goals weren't enough to stop Mohammedan SC guided by Iranian goalkeeper Nasser Hejazi, who played in the 1978 World Cup, putting an end to Abahani's title winning run, the club did manage a consolation, winning the 1986 Federation Cup trophy. The 1987 Dhaka League, was one of the most highly competitive league seasons in Dhaka football. Abahani made marquee signings of their own by bringing in Iraqi duo Samir Shaker and Karim Allawi both of whom played in the 1986 World Cup, and also completed the transfer of 19 year-old teenage sensation Monem Munna.  Abahani managed to retain the Federation Cup, but unfortunately lost out the league title to Mohammedan SC once again. Going into the last game of the season against Mohammedan, Abahani only needed a point to secure the title, however, among all the star players present, it was veteran midfielder and longtime Abahani servant Khurshid Alam Babul, who won the game for Mohammedan, scoring the winning goal as the game ended 3–2. With the two teams tied at the top with equal points, a play off match was required. On 9 September 2022, three days after the previous encounter, the title deciding game between Abahani-Mohammedan got underway, and after repeated police intervention, the high-voltage match which saw two players sent off after a scuffle, ended 0–0. After the game, players and officials from both teams agreed to be crowned joint-champions, fearing fan conflict after an intense game. However, the BFF did not accept the agreement and decided to hold a 2nd play-off match. Both captains Aslam & Ranjit Saha (Mohammedan SC), were given a 1-year ban, while Abahani's two key players in Moshin and Mostafa Kamal were banned for three months. On 26 October, the clubs played the second play off game behind closed doors, due to security concerns. Abahani lost the game 2–0.

In 1988, Abahani won the Federation Cup once again, their Sri Lankan striker PermLal, was also lethal that year, scoring 18 league goals, but eventually failed to prevent Moahmmedan SC from winning their hattrick league title. The subsequent year long serving club legends Ashrafuddin Ahmed Chunnu and Golam Rabbani Helal both announced their retirements, leading the club to put their faith into young duo, Monem Munna and Rizvi Karim Rumi. During the 1989–90 season, Abahani finally broke their league drought, with Sheikh Aslam scoring 11 league goals, Rumi becoming the second highest goal scorer, and club captain Ashish Bhadra ending his career by lifting the league title one last time. They were also able to win India's historic Sait Nagjee Trophy in 1989, under the management of former player Ashrafuddin Chunnu, they defeated previous years winner Salgaocar FC, 1–0 in the final, Aslam was the lone scorer. By 1989, the club had transitioned into a Limited Company. In 1990, a brace from Rizvi Karim Rumi, saw Abahani win their first Independence Cup, defeating Mohammedan SC 2–1. Abahani managed to defeat Indian giants East Bengal Club and rivals Mohammedan SC during their 1991 BTC Clubs Cup triumph. And as the Dhaka League was not held in 1991, East Bengal Club roped in Munna, Gaus, Rumi & Aslam from Abahani, for the Calcutta Football League.

A period of uncertainty (1992–2006)
In the mid-nineties, many players started leaving Bangladesh's top three clubs Mohammedan SC, Abahani and Brothers Union for Muktijoddha SKC, after the trio made a gentleman's agreement to lower player salaries. In 1992, Monem Munna returned to Abahani from India, and the club officials paid him a record fee of 20 lakh taka, which made nationwide headlines, preventing his move to Muktijoddha SKC. Munna lead a young Abahani team to the Dhaka League title beating a star-studded Muktijoddha side in the race. That year Abahani's new generation included Masoud Rana, Zakir Hossain and Mamun Joarder, the latter's brace against Mohammedan SC won Abahani the league in the season ending game. A pivotal part of the team was their Russian midfielder Sergey Zhukov who created an indestructible partnership with Zakir Hossain in midfield, during the course of the season. Even after their title triumph, aside from Munna, the rest of the players got salaries around Tk 8 to 12 lakh. The discord in the team camp, saw Abahani lose integral players each season. Among all the departures, Sheikh Aslam and Monem Munna remained loyal to the club, and carried on the teams legacy for the following few years, by winning consecutive league titles from 1994 to 1995. In 1994, Abahani defeated Kolkata Mohammedan in the final of India's Charms Cup, with goals from Mamun Joarder and Zulfiker Mintu. The joy did not last long as, Aslam who had 119 goals for the club, hung up his boots in 1996, while Munna was forced to retire in 1997, due to kidney complicacy. The 1997–98 Asian Cup Winners' Cup, saw Abahani thrash Sri Lanka's Old Benedictines Club 8–0 on aggregate. Nevertheless, the team was knocked out in the second round by Beijing Guoan, from China.

Since 1995, Abahani failed had to win the Dhaka League title for the next five years, which was the longest the club had been without a league title since inception. Abahani's rivalry with Mohammedan SC also lost its past popularity, this saw a major reduction in the clubs fanbase in the following years. In 2000, alongside the inconsistent Dhaka Premier Division League, the Bangladesh football federation arranged the National Football Championship, where clubs from all over the country took part in. Monem Munna who was named the Abahani's team manager following his retirement and ex-club captain turned coach Amalesh Sen, lead Abahani to winning both trophies in 2000, while also managing to retain the Dhaka League title, in 2001. Munna also guided the club to hattrick Federation Cup titles from 1997 till 2000, alongside different coaches. Nonetheless, Munna health deteriorated the following few years, making him unable to play an active role in the club. On 9 June 2005, 38 year old Monem Munna passed away due to kidney failure, while being technical advisor of the football committee. In 2006, the Dhaka League was made the country's second-tier after 58 years of existence as the top-tier, and although Abahani were crowned league champions 11 previous times, they failed win the league during its final three years, falling behind Mohammedan SC and Brothers Union.

Bangladesh Premier League era (2007–present)

In 2007, the Bangladesh Football Federation introduced the B.League, as the country's first ever professional football league. In order to end their league title drought, Abahani appointed Argentine Andrés Cruciani, who brought in Argentine trio Mariano Caporale, Mariano Sanchez and Hector Parodi. However, Cruciani departed midway through the season, and it was the local striker Zahid Hasan Ameli who lead Abahani to the title, by scoring 12 league goals under club legends Satyajit Das Rupu and Amalesh Sen who served as the team manager and head coach respectively. The same coaching staff managed to stir Abahani to consecutive league titles the following year. After securing the 2010 Federation Cup trophy, Amalesh Sen's Abahani side became the first club to win hattrick B.League titles with their 2009–10 Bangladesh League triumph, and striker Enamul Haque also became the first local golden boot winner in B.League history. The following season, Dhanmondi Club who were renamed as Sheikh Jamal Dhanmondi Club, became the first club aside from Abahani to win the professional league. 

On 6 August 2011, Abahani won the Bangladesh Super Cup, by defeating arch-rivals Mohammedan SC in the final and also managed to win the 2012 BPL, nonetheless Abahnai's record in continental competitions remained dismal, failing to advance past the group stages of the AFC President's Cup after five attempts. The following three years Abahani were not able to win a single trophy amidst the constant change of coaches, leading to Abahani supporters physically attacking players during games. In 2016, György Kottán's Abahani responded to their frustrated fans by winning the 2016 BPL, becoming the first club to win the Premier League with an unbeaten record. Abahani began their 2016–17 season by equaling Mohammedan SC's record of 10 Federation Cup trophies. On 5 January 2018, Abahani emerged as Bangladesh Premier League champions for the record sixth time, after they edged Sheikh Jamal DC 2–0 to confirm their second straight title with a game in hand. The club dedicated the title to their lifelong coach and former player Amalesh Sen, who died in October 2017. During the 2017–18 season, Abahani again managed to win the domestic double.

On 26 June 2019, Masih Saighani's stoppage time winner against Minerva Punjab during the final game of the 2019 AFC Cup group stage, saw Abahani make history by becoming the first Bangladeshi club to reach the Inter-zone play-off semi-finals of the AFC Cup. Abahani faced North Korean side April 25 SC, and managed to produce one of their finest performances since inception, by defeating the North Korean giants 4–3 in the first leg, which was held at the Bangabandhu National Stadium in Dhaka. Sohel Rana and Nabib Newaj Jibon scored once apiece while Nigerian striker Sunday Chizoba netted a brace. Nonetheless, Abahani were not able to repeat their past heroics during the away leg, at the Kim Il-sung Stadium in Pyongyang, losing the game 2–0 (5–4 aggregate).

Club culture

Crest & Colours
Abahani, means incoming message, sound or music, and thus, one of the clubs founding member Harunur Rashid designed the clubs crest after being influenced by the Flag of the United Nations. Similar to the United Nations flag, Abahani's crest has flowers on both sides. Regarding the design, Rahid said "The flag of the United Nations is blue, we take that color from there and to make it bloom better, I wrote Abahani below with yellow paint."

Sponsorship

Fans
During the early 70s, Abahani did not have an established fanbase, while the top sides such as BJMC, Moahmmedan and Wanderers who had supporters all across the country despised newcomers Abahani for taking their players, due to Sheikh Kamal and Harunur Rashid's strong influence. During the mid-70s Abahani players were constantly targeted, by rival supporters and football authorities because of political disputes, even more so after Sheikh Kamal's assassination, in 1975. After winning the 1977 edition of the Dhaka League with an unbeaten record, Abahani finally were able to get some recognition, forming a fanbase of their own. Since the start of the 80s, their supporters expanded throughout the country and were notorious for their violent altercations with Mohammedan SC supporters. Alongside the club, the supporters are also called the "Sky Blue Brigade". Throughout the 80s many Abahani supporters were killed or heavily injured due to their constant riots during games. The supporters are well known for attacking their own players, most recently in 2014, Mofazzal Hossain Shaikat, Shahidul Alam Sohel and Shaikat Bhowmik were reportedly injured by angry Abahani supporters, after being defeated by Mohammedan SC in the Semi-Finals of the Independence Cup. Abahani became one of the first Bangladeshi clubs to interact with fans through social media platforms.

Rivalries

Dhaka Derby

Dhaka Derby is a football match between Abahani Limited Dhaka and Mohammedan SC. It is considered to be the biggest match in Bangladeshi domestic football.

As of 22 June 2022, 133 matches have been played between the two teams out of which Abahani Limited Dhaka has won 56 matches and Mohammedan SC have won 41 times (including all competitive matches and exhibition games) while the other 23 matches ended in draws, from which 3 matches were abandoned.

The two clubs first met during the 1973 Dhaka Football League. Abahani defeated favourites Mohammedan 2–0 causing an upset. Amalesh Sen and Kazi Salahuddin scored the goals. In the return game during the league, with Mohammedan SC leading 1–0, a fight broke between fans and players, and the match was called off with Abahani withdrawing.

In September 1982, during the "Black September" event, when four Abahani players were arrested after a Dhaka Derby match, the arrestees later accused former Mohammedan SC striker and at the time the vice-president of the Bangladesh Football Federation, Hafizuddin Ahmed, of planing the whole incident beforehand in order to defame the club. The early years saw many violent confrontation between fans of both clubs, usually leading to police intervention or matches to be played behind closed doors, such as in 1987 when Mohammmedn SC secured the league title.

Some of Abahani's notable wins include the 1986 Federation Cup match, when Sri Lankan striker Premlal scored the first ever hattrick in a Dhaka Derby. While during the 1990 Independence Cup final, striker Rizvi Karim Rumi scored a brace against Mohammedan SC in a 2–1 win. Mamun Joarder scored twice against Mohammedan SC in the league deciding game in 1992, to win Abahani their eighth league title.

Club facilities

Ever since Harunur Rashid acquired the Dhanmondi field (now known as the Abahani Limited field) in 1966, it has been used as the main training ground for the club. The field is located on Road No. 19, and also has a basketball court and cricket ground connected to the club tent, all of which is owned by the Limited company.

Stadiums

Locations

While home matches have predominantly been played at the 36,000 capacity Bangabandhu National Stadium as, the domestic league regularly took place at a single venue. The stadium also hosted the  group stage and knockouts stage fixtures for Abahani during the 2019 AFC Cup. The country's national stadiumwas the main venue for the Dhaka League, ever since its inception during the East Pakistan era. During the entirety of the 70' and 80' when local football's popularity was at its peak, the Dhaka Derby attracted thousands of fans into the stadium from all over the country, and has numerous records of brwals breaking out among the fans.

Since 2022, the 15,000 capacity Sylhet District Stadium is being used as Abahani's home venue. The club shares the stadium with Rahmatganj MFS, during the league campaign. Before the 2018 Bangabandhu Cup the stadium went througnt half-month long renovation, with installations of sheds on gallery and digital board. The Sylhet stadium also regularly hosts international matches, for both the men's and women's senior national teams.

Sheikh Kamal sports complex
In 2011, the club desired to built its own sports complex, commemorating one of its finding members Sheikh Kamal the authorities decided that the Sheikh Kamal Sports Complex would be the new home of the Limited company. However, the construction process started from late 2022, when Abahani celebrated its 50th anniversary. A modern sports complex will be built in the rest of the football and cricket practice fields. The football stadium is rumored to have a capacity around 15,000, while it would also have its own media box and dressing room for both home and away teams.

Current squad

Abahani Limited Dhaka squad for 2022–23 season.

Personnel

Current technical staff

Board of directors

Head coach records

Statistics

Season by season record

Dhaka Football League (1973–2006)

Bangladesh Premier League (2007–Present)

Performance in AFC competitions

 Asian Club Championship/AFC Champions League: 1 Appearances
 1985–86 : Qualifying Round

 Asian Cup Winners' Cup: 2 Appearances
 1991–92 : First round
 1997–98 : Second round

 AFC President's Cup: 4 Appearance
 2008 : Group Stage
 2009 : Group Stage
 2011 : Group Stage
 2013 : Group Stage

 AFC Cup: 5 Appearance
 2017 : Group Stage
 2018 : Group Stage
 2019 : Inter-zone play-off semi-finals	
 2020 : Preliminary round 2
 2022 : Preliminary round 2

Continental record

Notable players

The players below had senior international cap(s) for their respective countries. Players whose name is listed, represented their countries before or after playing for Abahani Limited Dhaka.

Asia
 Pakir Ali (1986–89)
 Monoranjan Bhattacharya (1986)
 Bhaskar Ganguly (1986)
 Samir Shaker (1987–88)
 Karim Allawi (1987–88)
 Yousef Mohammad (2022–present)

Africa
 Abdou Darboe (2015)

North America
 Kervens Belfort (2018–21)
 Daniel Colindres (2022–present)

Honours and achievements

Domestic
League
  Bangladesh Premier League:
 Champions (6): 2007, 2008–09, 2009–10, 2012, 2016, 2017–18
  Dhaka League: 
 Champions (11): 1974, 1977, 1981, 1983, 1984, 1985, 1989–90, 1992, 1994, 1995, 2001

Cup
  Federation Cup:
 Champions (12): 1982, 1985, 1986, 1988, 1997, 1999, 2000, 2010, 2016, 2017, 2018, 2021–22
  Independence Cup:
 Champions (2): 1990, 2021–22
  National Football Championship: 
 Champions (1): 2000
  Liberation Cup: 
 Champions (1): 1977
  DMFA Cup: 
 Champions (1): 1994
  Independence Gold Cup (Rajshahi): 
 Champions (1): 2005
  Super Cup: 
 Champions (1): 2011

Invitational
  Sait Nagjee Trophy: 
 Champions (1): 1989
  BTC Club Cup: 
 Champions (1): 1991
  Charms Cup: 
 Champions (1): 1994
  Bordoloi Trophy:  
 Champions (1): 2010
 Independence Day Cup
 Runners-up (1): 1993

Notable wins against foreign teams

{| class="wikitable" style="font-size:80%; width:95%; text-align:center"
|-
!width="12%" style="background:#00bbff; color:white; text-align:center;"|Competition
!width="6%" style="background:#00bbff; color:white; text-align:center;"|Round
!width="10%" style="background:#00bbff; color:white; text-align:center;"|Year
!width="13%" style="background:#00bbff; color:white; text-align:center;"|Opposition
!width="5%" style="background:#00bbff; color:white; text-align:center;"|Score
!width="13%" style="background:#00bbff; color:white; text-align:center;"|Venue
!width="7%" style="background:#00bbff; color:white; text-align:center;"|City
!width="10%" style="background:#00bbff; color:white; text-align:center;"|Scorers
!width="5%" style="background:#00bbff; color:white; text-align:center;"|Ref
|-
|Friendly
|–
|1979
 Kolkata Mohammedan
|style="text-align:center; background:#CCFFCC;"|2–1
|Dhaka Stadium
|Dhaka
|Salahuddin, N/A
|
|-
|-
|Aga Khan Gold Cup
|Third Phase
|1979
 Afghanistan XI
|style="text-align:center; background:#CCFFCC;"|5–1
|Dhaka Stadium
|Dhaka
|Salahuddin (3), N/A (2)
|
|-
|Aga Khan Gold Cup
|Group Stage
|1982
 Persipal 
|style="text-align:center; background:#CCFFCC;"|5–0
|Dhaka Stadium
|Dhaka
|
|
|-
|Sait Nagjee Trophy
|Final
|1989
 Salgaocar FC
|style="text-align:center; background:#CCFFCC;"|1–0
|EMS Stadium
|Kerela
|Aslam
|
|-
|BTC Clubs Cup
|Group Stage
|1991
 Kolkata Mohammedan
|style="text-align:center; background:#CCFFCC;"|2–1
|Dhaka Stadium
|Calcutta
|Aslam, N/A
|
|-
|BTC Clubs Cup
|Semi-Final
|1991
 East Bengal Club 
|style="text-align:center; background:#CCFFCC;"|2–1
|Dhaka Stadium
|Calcutta
|Aslam, Rumi
|
|-
|Charms Cup
|Final
|1994
 Kolkata Mohammedan
| style="text-align:center; background:#CCFFCC;" |2–0
|Salt Lake Stadium
|Kolkata
|Joarder, Mintu
|
|-
|AFC Cup
|Inter-zone play-off semi-finals
|2019
 April 25 SC
| style="text-align:center; background:#CCFFCC;" |4–3
|Bangabandhu National Stadium
|Dhaka
|S. Rana, Jibon, Chizoba (2)
|
|-
|}

Club records

Individual
 Sheikh Mohammad Aslam is the club's all-time top scorer with a total of 119 goals in the Dhaka League.
 Abdus Sadek became the club's first captain during its first Dhaka League match, which came on June 11, 1972, against BJIC.
 Kazi Salahuddin scored 24 goals during the 1974 Dhaka League, which is the highest a player has scorerd for the club in a single league season.
 Sheikh Mohammad Aslam scored five goals against Club Valencia during the 1985–86 Asian Club Championship which is a record set by a Bangladeshi player in an AFC competition.
 In 1991, the club paid Monem Munna a record fee, 20 lakh taka, which was also a unique record for the whole of South Asia at that time.
 Monem Munna holds the record of captaining the club the highest amount of times. He captained them in 1990, 1991, 1994, 1995 and 1996. No other captain has led the club to the league title twice, coming in 1994 and 1995.
 Enamul Haque became the first and only Bangladeshi player to date to become top-scorer in the Bangladesh Premier League with 21 goals.
 Amalesh Sen coached the club into becoming the first hat-trick Bangladesh Premier League champions (2007, 2008–09, 2009–10).
 Sunday Chizoba of Nigeria is the top scorer for the club in the Bangladesh Premier League with 71 goals.

Overall records
First club after the independence of Bangladesh to participate in the IFA Shield, in 1974.
First club after the independence of Bangladesh to win a hat-trick of Dhaka League titles (1983, 1984 and 1985).
Second most registered undefeated league triumphs in the Dhaka League, coming in 1977, 1983, 1992 and 1994.
The club's 8–1 victory over Club Valencia at the 1985–86 Asian Club Championship is the biggest win earned by a Bangladeshi club in an AFC competition.
First club from Bangladesh to win India's Sait Nagjee Trophy, in its three-and-a-half-decade history.
First club to win the Bangladesh Premier League (formerly known as the B.League), coming during its first edition in 2007.
First club to win a hat-trick of Bangladesh Premier League titles (2007, 2008–09, 2009–10).
First club to win the Bangladesh Premier League as undefeated champions, during its 2016 edition.
First club from Bangladesh to reach the Inter-zone play-off semi-finals of the AFC Cup, during its 2019 edition.

Notes

References

External links
 Abahani Limited FIFA page
Team info at GSA

Abahani Limited Dhaka
Association football clubs established in 1972
Football clubs in Bangladesh
1972 establishments in Bangladesh